António, Prior of Crato (1531–1595) would have been King Antonio I of Portugal.

Antonio I may also refer to:

 Antonio I della Scala (1362–1388), Lord of Verona (ruled 1371–1387)
 Antonio I Acciaioli (died 1435), Duke of Athens
 Antonio I Ordelaffi (1390–1448), Lord of Forlì 
 António I of Kongo (died 1665),  mwenekongo of the Kingdom of Kongo
 Antonio I, Prince of Monaco (1661–1731), sovereign Prince of Monaco
 Orélie-Antoine de Tounens (1825–1878), Antonio I of Araucanía and Patagonia